The UK Albums Chart is one of many music charts compiled by the Official Charts Company that calculates the best-selling albums of the week in the United Kingdom. Since 2004 the chart has been based on the sales of both physical albums and digital downloads. This list shows albums that peaked in the Top 10 of the UK Albums Chart during 2006, as well as albums which peaked in 2005 and 2007 but were in the top 10 in 2006. The entry date is when the album appeared in the top 10 for the first time (week ending, as published by the Official Charts Company, which is six days after the chart is announced).

One-hundred and thirty-two albums were in the top ten this year. Fourteen albums from 2005 remained in the top 10 for several weeks at the beginning of the year, while Back to Black by Amy Winehouse and Loose by Nelly Furtado were both released in 2006 but did not reach their peak until 2007. Breakaway by Kelly Clarkson, Employment by Kaiser Chiefs, In Between Dreams by Jack Johnson, PCD by The Pussycat Dolls and Stars of CCTV by Hard-Fi were the albums from 2005 to reach their peak in 2006. Two artists scored multiple entries in the top 10 in 2006. Arctic Monkeys, Editors, The Kooks, Rihanna and Shayne Ward were among the many artists who achieved their first UK charting top 10 album in 2006.

The 2005 Christmas number-one album, Curtain Call: The Hits by Eminem, remained at the top spot for the first week of 2006. The first new number-one album of the year was First Impressions of Earth by The Strokes. Overall, thirty-three different albums peaked at number-one in 2006, with thirty-three unique artists hitting that position.

Background

Multiple entries
One-hundred and thirty-two albums charted in the top 10 in 2006, with one-hundred and twenty-one albums reaching their peak this year (including Snap!, which charted in previous years but reached a peak on its latest chart run).

Two artist scored multiple entries in the top 10 in 2006. Robbie Williams had three top 10 albums this year, while Daniel O'Donnell had two entries. Daniel O'Donnell's two entries were both released this year.

Chart debuts
Thirty-six artists achieved their first top 10 album in 2006 as a lead artist.

The following table (collapsed on desktop site) does not include acts who had previously charted as part of a group and secured their first top 10 solo album, or featured appearances on compilations or other artists recordings.

Notes
Simon Webbe released his debut album in 2006 during his group Blue's hiatus - he had recorded 3 number-one albums and a number 6 peaking compilation album with his bandmates by that point. David Gilmour was part of the highly successful Pink Floyd but he secured his first solo top 10 album this year with On an Island going straight to the top of the chart. His previous two efforts - 1978's self-titled album (17) and 1984's About Face (21) - both fell short of the top ten.

Like fellow Libertines member Pete Doherty with Babyshambles the previous year, Carl Barat hit the chart with his new band Dirty Pretty Things with their debut album Waterloo to Anywhere, peaking at number three. Similarly another new rock band The Raconteurs included The White Stripes frontman Jack White among its line-up.

Thom Yorke stepped into the spotlight away from Radiohead with his debut album, The Eraser reaching third position in the chart. Pharrell Williams also reached the top 10 with his first solo effort, In My Mind. With his group N.E.R.D., Fly or Die had previously made the chart.

Best-selling albums
Snow Patrol had the best-selling album of the year with Eyes Open. The album spent 35 weeks in the top 10 (including three weeks at number one), sold 1.504 million copies and was certified 5× platinum by the BPI. Beautiful World by Take That came in second place. Scissor Sisters' Ta-Dah, Whatever People Say I Am, That's What I'm Not from Arctic Monkeys and Inside In / Inside Out by The Kooks made up the top five. Albums by Razorlight, Oasis, Westlife, Pink and James Morrison were also in the top ten best-selling albums of the year.

Top-ten albums
Key

Entries by artist
The following table shows artists who achieved two or more top 10 entries in 2006, including albums that reached their peak in 2005. The figures only include main artists, with featured artists and appearances on compilation albums not counted individually for each artist. The total number of weeks an artist spent in the top ten in 2006 is also shown.

Notes

 Employment re-entered the top 10 at number 7 on 7 January 2006 (week ending) for 10 weeks.
 Eye to the Telescope re-entered the top 10 at number 6 on 14 January 2006 (week ending) for 2 weeks and at number 4 on 25 February 2006 (week ending) for 5 weeks.
 Demon Days re-entered the top 10 at number 7 on 25 February 2006 (week ending) for 3 weeks.
 Monkey Business re-entered the top 10 at number 10 on 22 April 2006 (week ending).
 X & Y re-entered the top 10 at number 8 on 25 February 2006 (week ending).
 Stars of CCTV re-entered the top 10 at number 4 on 7 January 2006 (week ending) for 6 weeks.
 Breakaway re-entered the top 10 at number 10 on 28 January 2006 (week ending) and at number 10 on 11 February 2006 (week ending) for 4 weeks.
 In Between Dreams re-entered the top 10 at number 9 on 28 January 2006 (week ending), at number 6 on 25 February 2006 (week ending) for 10 weeks and at number 10 on 13 May 2006 (week ending) for 4 weeks.
 PCD re-entered the top 10 at number 10 on 7 January 2006 (week ending) and at number 7 on 8 July 2006 (week ending) for 2 weeks.
 Piece by Piece re-entered the top 10 at number 9 on 14 January 2006 (week ending) for 2 weeks.
 Keep On re-entered the top 10 at number 10 on 21 January 2006 (week ending) for 6 weeks and at number 10 on 6 May 2006 (week ending) for 3 weeks.
 Greatest Hits by Robbie Williams originally peaked at number-one on its initial release in 2004.
 Inside In / Inside Out re-entered the top 10 at number 9 on 8 April 2006. (week ending) for 10 weeks, at number 7 on 24 June 2006 (week ending) for 12 weeks and at number 8 on 7 October 2006 (week ending) for 2 weeks.
 Snap! originally peaked at number 2 upon its initial release in 1983.
 Corinne Bailey Rae re-entered the top 10 at number 8 on 20 May 2006 (week ending) and at number 10 on 21 October 2006 (week ending).
 Voice: The Best of Beverley Knight re-entered the top 10 at number 9 on 22 April 2006 (week ending) for 2 weeks.
 I'm Not Dead re-entered the top 10 at number 5 on 10 June 2006 (week ending), at number 10 on 16 September 2006 (week ending) for 2 weeks and at number 6 on 6 January 2007 (week ending) for 2 weeks.
 Tired of Hanging Around  re-entered the top 10 at number 5 on 8 July 2006 (week ending) for 4 weeks.
 St. Elsewhere re-entered the top 10 at number 10 on 12 August 2006 (week ending).
 A Girl like Me re-entered the top 10 at number 10 on 8 July 2006 (week ending) for 7 weeks.
 Eyes Open re-entered the top 10 at number 6 on 22 July 2006 (week ending) for 16 weeks and at number 7 on 23 December 2006 (week ending) for 12 weeks.
 Bright Idea re-entered the top 10 at number 4 on 19 August 2006 (week ending) for 3 weeks.
 Twelve Stops and Home re-entered the top 10 at number 10 on 26 August 2006 (week ending) for 6 weeks.
 Under the Iron Sea re-entered the top 10 at number 9 on 26 August 2006 (week ending) for 2 weeks and at number 8 on 3 February 2007 (week ending) for 2 weeks.
 Loose re-entered the top 10 at number 9 on 9 September 2006 (week ending) for 3 weeks, at number 9 on 3 March 2007 (week ending) for 3 weeks, at number 6 on 31 March 2007 (week ending) for 7 weeks and at number 7 on 14 July 2007 (week ending) for 3 weeks.
 Black Holes and Revelations re-entered the top 10 at number 8 on 9 September 2006 (week ending) for 2 weeks.
 Razorlight re-entered the top 10 at number 8 on 23 September 2006 (week ending) for 8 weeks, at number 7 on 25 November 2006 (week ending) for 2 weeks, at number 9 on 30 December 2006 (week ending) for 6 weeks and at number 9 on 24 February 2007 (week ending).
 Alright, Still re-entered the top 10 at number 4 on 7 October 2006 (week ending) for 4 weeks, at number 6 on 27 January 2007 (week ending) for 2 weeks and at number 7 on 3 March 2007 (week ending) for 2 weeks.
 These Streets re-entered the top 10 at number 10 on 7 October 2006 (week ending) for 2 weeks, at number 8 on 28 October 2006 (week ending), at number 9 on 13 January 2007 (week ending) for 4 weeks and at number 10 on 1 September 2007 (week ending) for 2 weeks.
 Undiscovered re-entered the top 10 at number 8 on 21 October 2006 (week ending) for 3 weeks and at number 8 on 6 January 2007 (week ending) for 9 weeks.
 FutureSex/LoveSounds re-entered the top 10 at number 10 on 11 November 2006 (week ending), at number 9 on 31 March 2007 (week ending) for 2 weeks and at number 7 on 21 April 2007 (week ending) for 3 weeks.
 Costello Music re-entered the top 10 at number 6 on 13 January 2007 (week ending) for 4 weeks and at number 10 on 3 March 2007 (week ending).
 Ta-Dah re-entered the top 10 at number 10 on 30 December 2006 (week ending).
 Sam's Town re-entered the top 10 at number 6 on 3 March 2007 (week ending) for 3 weeks and at number 9 on 7 July 2007 (week ending).
 Back to Black re-entered the top 10 at number 2 on 13 January 2007 (week ending) for 28 weeks, at number 8 on 28 July 2007 (week ending) for 18 weeks and at number 9 on 8 December 2007 (week ending) for 7 weeks.
 Beautiful World re-entered the top 10 at number 5 on 24 February 2007 (week ending) for 10 weeks, at number 9 on 24 November 2007 (week ending) for 2 weeks and at number 10 on 15 December 2007 (week ending) for 8 weeks.
 B'Day re-entered the top 10 at number 8 on 5 May 2007 (week ending).
 Figure includes album that peaked in 2005.

See also
2006 in British music
List of number-one albums from the 2000s (UK)

References
General

Specific

External links
2006 album chart archive at the Official Charts Company (click on relevant week)

United Kingdom top 10 albums
Top 10 albums
2006